{{Speciesbox 
| image = Sikukia stejnegeri Smith, 1931 1317255267.jpg
| status = LC
| status_system = IUCN3.1
| status_ref = 
| taxon = Sikukia stejnegeri| authority = Smith, 1931
}}Sikukia stejnegeri'' is a species of freshwater cyprinid fish native to Southeast Asia.

References

Cyprinid fish of Asia
Fish described in 1931
Taxobox binomials not recognized by IUCN